On May 19, 2022, a mass shooting occurred in Chicago, Illinois, United States, in the city's Magnificent Mile shopping district, near Michigan Avenue. Two people were killed, and eight others were injured. The accused perpetrator, Jaylun Sanders, was taken into custody with the weapon also being obtained by Chicago police.

Shooting 
The shooting occurred at about 10:40p.m. CDT (UTC−05:00), near a McDonald's establishment on the Near North Side neighborhood of Chicago. The incident occurred a few blocks from the city's Magnificent Mile shopping district. The shooting happened as a result of an altercation outside the McDonald's restaurant. The cause of the altercation is not yet known; however it was described as "personal" by detectives. The shooting was triggered when police officers, who were near the area noticed two groups engaging in a fight.

After the shooting, the suspect fled and caused a chase between police officials to the Chicago station of the city's Red Line. Amid the chase, a woman fell onto the tracks and was electrocuted at the State Street subway. Passengers from this station were evacuated at around 11:30p.m., an hour after the shooting.

Several of the victims were hospitalized at Northwestern Memorial Hospital. All wounded victims were reported under serious condition.

The shooting was significant because it happened a week after a shooting in downtown Chicago's Millennium Park where a teen was shot and killed and led the city to enforce a curfew for young people.

Three days after the shooting, 21-year-old Chicago native Jaylun Sanders was named by Cook County prosecutors as the perpetrator of the shooting. The weapon used was a Glock 19 handgun that Sanders had purchased from a relative in Indiana. The Glock was also outfitted with a device which allows full auto fire.

Victims 
Two people were killed in the shooting, one of the victims being 30-year-old Antonio Wade. Wade was one of the individuals involved in the altercation that led to the shooting. The incident was recorded by several cell phones nearby the crime scene. The second victim was a 31-year-old male, who was hospitalized at John H. Stroger Jr. Hospital of Cook County, and was shot in the back of the head.

Aftermath 
In the aftermath of the shooting, a suspect was arrested by police on May 20, 2022. Another person was arrested for obstructing the officers from making an arrest at the scene. In response to the shooting, Mayor Lori Lightfoot called the shooting "an outrageous act of violence" and announced that the city would increase police presence near the area of the shooting. The Chicago Tribune reported that during the shooting, a fight had happened between a witness and police officials.

Lightfoot and Superintendent of the Chicago Police Department David Brown blamed the shooting on the parents of the suspects.

See also 
 List of mass shootings in the United States in 2022

References 

2022 in Illinois
2022 mass shootings in the United States
2020s crimes in Illinois
2020s in Chicago
Mass shootings in Illinois
Mass shootings in the United States
May 2022 crimes in the United States
Murder in Chicago